Sacred Heart Church, School and Rectory was a historic site at 2540–2544 Madison Avenue and 910 West 26th Street in Kansas City, Missouri. The church was built in 1896 and added to the National Register of Historic Places in 1978. The Rectory and School building were demolished in 2010 but the original church building and its parish hall remain.

The congregation is now known as Sacred Heart Guadalupe due to its merger with Our Lady of Guadalupe Church in 1991

References

Second Empire architecture in Missouri
Queen Anne architecture in Missouri
School buildings completed in 1896
Schools in Kansas City, Missouri
School buildings on the National Register of Historic Places in Missouri
Churches on the National Register of Historic Places in Missouri
Roman Catholic churches in Kansas City, Missouri
National Register of Historic Places in Kansas City, Missouri